Kim Hee-chul (born July 10, 1983) is a South Korean singer-songwriter, actor and television personality, and a member of the K-pop boy band Super Junior. He made his acting debut as Baek Jin-woo in the second season of the teen-drama television series Sharp (2005), and acted in leading roles in Rainbow Romance (2005–2006) and Flower Grandpa Investigation Unit (2014); and in supporting roles in Bad Family (2006), Golden Bride (2007–2008), and Loving You a Thousand Times (2009–2010). He starred in the high-school mystery and comedy film Attack on the Pin-Up Boys (2007) in his film debut, and voiced Simon Seville in the South Korean dub of Alvin and the Chipmunks.

Kim started his career as a host on the weekly music show Show! Music Tank in 2005. He was a recurrent host of Inkigayo between 2005 and 2006, before becoming a regular host from 2007 until 2008. Kim was the host of the talk show Radio Star between 2010 and 2011, for which he won the Best Newcomer Award at the 11th MBC Entertainment Awards. He became a radio DJ through the radio programs Young Street Radio (20052006), and later Kim Heechul's Youngstreet (20102011). In 2011, he enlisted in the military as a public service worker and hosted the Seongdong District's web radio program Space for a Rest – Visible Radio (20122013) as part of his service.

Kim's popularity skyrocketed after he was cast in the variety show Knowing Bros in 2015 alongside veteran host Kang Ho-dong and vocalist Min Kyung-hoon. His role in the show earned him his first Baeksang Arts Awards nomination, in the Best Male Variety Performer category at the 56th ceremony. He also won the Best Entertainer Award, and the Best Couple Award with Min, at the 5th JTBC Awards for his role in the show. The duo have since released the singles "Sweet Dream" (2016), "Falling Blossoms" (2018) and "Hanryang" (2020) through the variety show, the first two of which earned them Best Rock Song Awards at the 9th and 10th Melon Music Awards, respectively. Kim has also been a regular cast member on the reality shows My Little Old Boy and Delicious Rendezvous since 2019, for both of which he received the Excellence Award at the 13th SBS Entertainment Awards and the Top Excellence Award at the 14th SBS Entertainment Awards.

Kim has acted in several music videos, including in TraxX's "Let You Go" and Sistar's "Shady Girl", both released in 2010; directed music videos including M&D's "Close Ur Mouth" (2011; his directorial debut), "I Wish" (2015), "Narcissus" (2016) and "Ulsanbawi" (2016); and wrote the screenplays to "Falling Blossoms" (2018), "Old Movie" (2019) and "White Winter" (2019).

Films

Television shows

Web series

Stage

Radio shows

Events

Music videos

See also 
 Super Junior filmography
 Super Junior videography

Notes

References 

Performances
Kim Hee-chul